Alignment may refer to:

Archaeology
 Alignment (archaeology), a co-linear arrangement of features or structures with external landmarks
 Stone alignment, a linear arrangement of upright, parallel megalithic standing stones

Biology
 Structural alignment, establishing similarities in the 3D structure of protein molecules
 Sequence alignment, in bioinformatics, arranging the sequences of DNA, RNA, or protein to identify similarities
 Alignment program, software used in sequence alignment

Engineering
 Road alignment, the route of a road, defined as a series of horizontal tangents and curves, as defined by planners and surveyors
 Railway alignment, three-dimensional geometry of track layouts
 Transfer alignment, a process for initializing and calibrating the inertial navigation system on a missile or torpedo
 Shaft alignment, in mechanical engineering, aligning two or more shafts with each other
 Wheel alignment, automobile wheel and suspension angles which affect performance and tire wear

Technology
 AI alignment, the issue of aligning artificial intelligence goal systems with human values
 Alignment level, an audio recording/engineering term for a selected point in the audio that represents a reasonable sound level
 Business-IT alignment, how well an organization is able to use Information Technology to achieve objectives 
 Data structure alignment, arranging data in computer memory to fit machine design, also known more simply as an alignment structure
 Music alignment, link various music representation (sheet music, audio, video, MIDI, etc.) related to a given musical work
 Partition alignment, letting address ranges of hard disk drive partitions start at certain physical boundaries or at multiples of units such as 1 MB

Linguistics and typography
 Morphosyntactic alignment, the linguistic system used to distinguish between the arguments of transitive and intransitive verbs
 Parallel text alignment, the identification of corresponding sentences in original and translated texts
 Typographic alignment, placement of printed matter relative to a page, column, margin, etc.

Other forms of alignment
 Alignment of random points in statistics representing data points that lie on a relatively straight path
 Alignment of the body in a dance hall, see Direction of movement#Basic directions of movement with respect to the room
 Chiropractic alignment, another term for chiropractic adjustment
 Constructive alignment, a method of devising teaching activities that directly address learning outcomes
 Ontology alignment, the process of determining correspondences between concepts
 Planetary alignment, in astronomy, a straight line configuration of three celestial bodies

Politics
 Alignment (Israel), political party from 1965 to 1992

Entertainment
 Alignment (role-playing games), the moral and ethical perspective of the characters, monsters, and societies
 Alignment (Dungeons & Dragons)
 The Alignment, a 2012 album by Samestate 
 Alignments (album), a 2020 album by Double Experience

See also
 Unaligned (disambiguation)